Cerro Benítez ("Benítez hill") is a mountain in the Patagonian region of Chile. In a larger context this feature is an element of the Cerro Toro geological complex. The Cueva del Milodón Natural Monument is situated on the southern flank of Cerro Benítez. The Cerro Benítez is a location for sighting of the Andean condor.

See also
Señoret Channel
Silla del Diablo

References
 C. Michael Hogan (2008) Cueva del Milodon, The Megalithic Portal, ed. A. Burnham 
 Stephen M. Hubbard, Brian W. Romans and Stephan A. Graham (2008) Deep-water foreland basin deposits of the Cerro Toro Formation, Magallanes basin, Chile: architectural elements of a sinuous basin axial channel belt, Sedimentology, Mar. 2008
 Víctor A. Ramos and J. Duncan Keppie (1999) Laurentia-Gondwana Connections Before Pangea, Geological Society of America

Line notes

Última Esperanza Province
Landforms of Magallanes Region
Mountains of Chile